Cabo Girão is a lofty sea cliff located along the southern coast of the island of Madeira, in the Portuguese archipelago of Madeira, geographically part of Africa. Cabo Girão is a tourist lookout point, with up to 1800 visitors a day. The location is also a common starting point for hikers.

Skywalk

The Cabo Girão Skywalk is the highest cliff skywalk in Europe, located on top of the cabo Girão Cliff in Madeira Island. The skywalk opened in late October 2012 and is similar to the one in America's Grand Canyon - both are made of transparent glass to provide views to visitors.

Geography

It is situated less than two kilometres west from the centre of Câmara de Lobos, between the parishes of Quinta Grande and Câmara de Lobos. The escarpment/cliffs extend approximately three kilometres between the urban sprawl of Câmara de Lobos to the east and the river-valley of Quinta Grande in the west.

There are cultivated wave-cut platforms (Fajãs de Cabo Girão) located below the sheer cliffs, which at one time were only accessible by boat. In August 2003, a cable car was installed on the slope of the cliff so farmers can reach these low-lying fields.

Architecture
Apart from the communications towers that are installed on Cabo Girão, the Cape is noted for the Chapel of Nossa Senhora da Fátima, which was built in 1974 to replace a much smaller chapel built in 1931.

References

External links
 

Cliffs of Portugal
Geography of Madeira
Tourist attractions in Madeira